"All the Above" is the first single from Beanie Sigel's fourth studio album, The Solution.

Background
The track features R. Kelly and was produced by The Runners. It samples a line off from  Jay-Z's skit "Public Service Announcement (Interlude)" from his album The Black Album.

Beanie Sigel spoke on the single, he said:

Music video
The music video is directed by Jessy Terrero.

Chart

References

2007 singles
R. Kelly songs
Beanie Sigel songs
Male vocal duets
Songs written by R. Kelly
Roc-A-Fella Records singles
Song recordings produced by the Runners
2007 songs
Def Jam Recordings singles
Songs written by Jermaine Jackson (hip hop producer)
Songs written by Andrew Harr
Songs written by Beanie Sigel